My Niece Susanne is a 1950 West German musical comedy film directed by Wolfgang Liebeneiner and starring Hilde Krahl, Inge Meysel and Harald Paulsen. It is set in Paris at the beginning of the twentieth century.

Production
The operetta had previously been made into the unfinished 1945 film  by Géza von Bolváry.

It was shot at the Göttingen Studios. The film's sets were designed by the art director Walter Haag.

Cast
Hilde Krahl as Susanne de Montebello
Inge Meysel as Blanche, ihre Freundin
Ingrid Pankow as Nina, ihre Zofe
Harald Paulsen as Jean
Gerd Martienzen as Eusebius
Karl Schönböck as Don Manual Carcocastilla
Carl-Heinz Schroth as Pedro, sein Diener
Hans Leibelt as Gratin, Zahnarzt
Alice Treff as Frau Gratin
Käte Pontow as Bathilde
Werner Finck as Dubouton
Hubert von Meyerinck as Oscar, Friseur

References

External links

1950 musical comedy films
West German films
Films directed by Wolfgang Liebeneiner
Films set in Paris
1950s historical comedy films
Films based on operettas
Films based on adaptations
German historical comedy films
German historical musical films
German black-and-white films
1950s German films
Films shot at Göttingen Studios
1950s German-language films
1950s historical musical films